Uranoceras is a barrandeocerid genus from the Middle Silurian belonging to the family Uranoceratidae, characterized by  its loosely coiled, gyroconic shell of 1.5 to 2 subquadrate whorls.

The shell of Uranoceras is typically smooth but may have growth lines that form a hyponomic sinus on the venter. The Siphuncle is large, displaced slightly ventral from the center.  Septal necks are straight; connecting rings cylindrical,  thin, and strongly contracted where they meet the necks.

Uranoceras has been found in Indiana, Illinois, and Wisconsin in the United States; Anticosti Island in Canada; and in both central and northern Europe.

See also 

 List of nautiloids

References

 Sweet, Walter C. 1964. Nautiloidea-Barrandeocerida. Treatise on Invertebrate Paleontology, Part K. Geol Soc of America and Univ Kansas Press. 
 Sepkoski, J.J. Jr. 2002. A compendium of fossil marine animal genera. D.J. Jablonski & M.L. Foote (eds.). Bulletins of American Paleontology 363: 1–560. Sepkoski's Online Genus Database (CEPHALOPODA)

Prehistoric nautiloid genera